Synodus tectus, the tectus lizardfish, is a species of lizardfish that lives mainly in the West Indo-Pacific Ocean.

References
 

Synodontidae
Fish described in 1981